Yury Yakovlevich Chaika (born 21 May 1951) is a Russian jurist and politician, Presidential Envoy to the North Caucasian Federal District since 2020. Previously he served Prosecutor General of Russia from 2006 to 2020 and Minister of Justice from 1999 to 2006.

Career
In 1995, he became first deputy Russian prosecutor general.  He was appointed by then Prosecutor General Yury Skuratov, his former classmate from Sverdlovsk Institute of Law. Following Skuratov's suspension, Chaika served as acting prosecutor general for a brief spell between April and August 1999. From August 1999 to June 2006, he served as justice minister.

On 23 June 2006, Chaika became Russian prosecutor general, effectively swapping jobs with his predecessor Vladimir Ustinov who took up the post of justice minister.

A "Crown prosecutor" (likely a reference to Chaika) was mentioned in an email chain released on 11 July 2017 by the son of then Republican Presidential nominee Donald Trump, Don Jr, in regards to the Russian government and their alleged attempts to provide damaging information during the U.S. Presidential election of 2016. The email thread resulted in the Trump campaign–Russian meeting of June 2016.

On 20 January 2020, he resigned in connection with the transition to another job. The resignation request is expected to be considered by the Federation Council on 22 January.

On 22 January 2020 he was appointed Presidential Plenipotentiary Envoy to North Caucasus Federal District.

Notable cases
On 14 June 2006, the Prosecutor General's Office reported that it had reopened the "Three Whales" corruption investigation, a case in which nineteen high-ranking FSB (Federal Security Service) officers were allegedly involved in furniture smuggling cases, as well as illegally importing consumer goods from China. The mass media revealed that the officials dismissed around that time had worked in the Moscow and federal offices of the FSB, the Prosecutor General's Office, the Moscow Regional Prosecutor's Office, the Federal Customs Service and the Presidential Executive Office. Deputy heads of the FSB Internal Security Department also figured in the report authored by Viktor Cherkesov. The purge occurred while FSB head Nikolai Patrushev was on vacation.

On 27 December 2006, he accused Leonid Nevzlin, a former vice president of Yukos, exiled in Israel and wanted by the Russian authorities for a long time, of involvement in Alexander Litvinenko poisoning, a charge dismissed by the latter as a nonsense.

On 16 January 2007, Chaika announced that the Tambov Gang had recently forcefully taken over 13 large enterprises in Saint Petersburg and was subject to an investigation. The leader of the gang, Vladimir Kumarin, was arrested on 24 August 2007. His associate and member of Putin's cooperative "Ozero" Vladimir Smirnov was dismissed from his position of Tekhsnabexport director.

On 1 December 2015, Alexei Navalny's Anti-Corruption Foundation (FBK) published a large investigation on Yuri Chaika, and his family. The Report comes with a 40-minute film Chaika. An English version of the film was published two months later. On 3 February 2016, the group Pussy Riot released a satirical music video titled Chaika, alluding to Navalny's findings.

On March 15, 2017, the Ministry of Justice in Russia filed a claim with the Supreme Court of the Russian Federation seeking "to declare the religious organization, the Administrative Center of Jehovah’s Witnesses, extremist, ban its activity, and liquidate it." Yury Chaika will be heading the prosecution.

Sanctions 

In July 2022 the European Union imposed sanctions on Chaika in relation to the 2022 Russian invasion of Ukraine.

Awards 
 Order of Honour (Armenia)
 Order of Friendship (Armenia) (2016)

Notes

References

See also 

 Three Whales Corruption Scandal

External links 
 
 Chaika's profile and assets on Russian Asset Tracker

1951 births
Living people
1st class Active State Councillors of the Russian Federation
People from Nikolayevsk-on-Amur
Justice ministers of Russia
Prosecutors
General Prosecutors of Russia
20th-century Russian lawyers
21st-century Russian lawyers
Ural State Law University alumni
Russian individuals subject to the U.S. Department of the Treasury sanctions